The Federal Executive Council (FEC, Serbo-Croatian, Savezno izvršno vijeće (SIV), Савезно извршно веће (СИВ))
was the executive body of the Socialist Federal Republic of Yugoslavia (SFRY) responsible for state affairs and for supervising the implementation of laws. It consisted of up to 15 members elected by the Federal Assembly for a four-year term and the presidents of executive councils of republics and provinces. The Federal Executive Council played an important role in the Government of the SFRY from its creation in 1953 until the breakup of Yugoslavia in 1992.

Structure 
The FEC was led by a President (also called Prime Minister) and two vice presidents, who were elected by the S.F.R.Y assembly on request of the President of the Socialist Federalist Republic of Yugoslavia. Council members (also called secretariats) were elected to equally represent the six republics making up the S.F.R.Y, as well as the two autonomous regions in Serbia, Kosovo and Vojvodina. Both the President and council members of the FEC would hold terms of four years. The FEC President could not hold more than two consecutive terms, however council members were allowed to hold up to 3 terms under certain statutes. Elections for a new Federal Executive Council would take place after the creation of each new S.F.R.Y Assembly and their respective constitutions. Members of the FEC give up their positions in the S.F.R.Y assembly when elected. The FEC President had the right to call meeting of the council at any time. The S.F.R.Y President or at least five council members also had the right to call a meeting as well.

The council was composed of six federal secretariats:
People's Defence
Foreign Affairs
Internal Affairs
Finances
Justice
Freight Transport

The Committee for Foreign Trade and 12 internal secretariats in:
Administration
Directorates
Administrative institutions
Inspectorates
Commissions
The Federal Executive Council as a whole was considered a cabinet if one was to compare SFR Yugoslavia to other countries at the time.

Responsibilities 
The FEC was responsible for most day to day tasks of the S.F.R.Y assembly. These included reviewing policy set by the S.F.R.Y assembly, creation of federal bills to be submitted to the S.F.R.Y assembly, submission of budget regulations for the Federal Budget, and adopting regulations to enforce Federal Statutes.

The creation of legislation could take the FEC about a year before it is sent to the Federal Assembly. In the 1970s, the FEC was behind the creation of legislation tackling controversial issues in Yugoslavia regarding the six republics. The FEC was one of the few bureaucratic bodies in Yugoslavia that had access to reliable information needed to create effective policies. The 1974 Constitution of Yugoslavia also gave the FEC the right to appoint council members to the new state presidency, which became the administration and command authority for the Yugoslav People's Army. They would appoint the councils of state security, national defense, foreign policy, and  protection of the constitutional order.

History

Notable Events 
During the 1953 revision of the Yugoslav Constitution, Josip Broz Tito was elected both President of Yugoslavia and of the new FEC by a vote of 568-1. Under these revisions, the Yugoslav Government was to function without the Parliament until new elections could take place in the Spring of 1954. The Parliament selected thirty of its own members to serve in the FEC.

In 1962, The League of Communists of Yugoslavia planned a restructuring of the Yugoslav Government. They planned to add a "top council" led by a premier that would take over the role of the FEC, effectively dissolving the council. Any member in this new council could be removed by the Parliament at any time. The 1963 Yugoslav Constitution allowed a new council to be created, but did not dissolve the FEC. Instead, this new council would play a more local role, focusing on culture, social welfare, and public administration in the six republics. Up until 1963, the President of the Council was held simultaneously by the President of the Socialist Federal Republic of Yugoslavia. After 1963, the president was elected by the Federal People's Assembly. No government official could hold two office positions at the same time after the 1963 Constitution excluding Tito.

The Council was housed in the SIV 1 building in Belgrade.

After Tito's death in 1980, many of the six republics began to demand more autonomy and were voicing their interest more aggressively. To try and settle negotiations, the FEC relied heavily on temporary measures outlined in the constitution. These measures could not be blocked by protesting delegations and could only be overturned by unanimous decision of the delegations. These measures, that were only supposed to be used for shot-term periods, were used extensively for long periods of time. The FEC's failure to create effective long-term legislation could be seen as one of the many factors leading up to the Breakup of Yugoslavia.

Councils

Second Federal Executive Council of Josip Broz Tito
The Third Federal Executive Council of Josip Broz Tito was Yugoslavia's national government from 30 January 1954 to 19 April 1958. Josip Broz Tito was its president, simultaneously also serving as president of the republic and president of the party.

Third Federal Executive Council of Josip Broz Tito
The Third Federal Executive Council of Josip Broz Tito was Yugoslavia's national government from 19 April 1958 to 29 June 1963. Josip Broz Tito was its president, simultaneously also serving as national president and general secretary of the League of Communists of Yugoslavia.

Members ex officio

First Federal Executive Council of Džemal Bijedić
The First Federal Executive Council of Džemal Bijedić was the Socialist Federal Republic of Yugoslavia's national government from 30 July 1971 to 16 May 1974.

Second Federal Executive Council of Džemal Bijedić
The Second Federal Executive Council of Džemal Bijedić was the Socialist Federal Republic of Yugoslavia's national government from 16 May 1974 to 16 May 1978. Džemal Bijedić was its first president until his death on 18 January 1977. He was subsequently replaced by Veselin Đuranović as president on 15 March to the end of the Federal Executive Council's four-year term.

Federal Executive Council of Veselin Đuranović
The Federal Executive Council of Veselin Đuranović was the Yugoslavia's national government from 16 May 1978 to 16 May 1982. The federal executive council had 29 members. Veselin Đuranović was its president. Another 14 members represented the country's six republics (with two members each) and the two autonomous provinces (with one member each), serving as either vice-presidents or as members without portfolio. The remaining 14 members served as federal secretaries and chairmen.

Federal Executive Council of Milka Planinc
The Federal Executive Council of Milka Planinc was Yugoslavia's national government from 16 May 1982 to 16 May 1986. The federal executive council had 29 members. Milka Planinc was its president. Another 14 members represented the country's six republics (with two members each) and the two autonomous provinces (with one member each), serving as either vice-presidents or as members without portfolio. The remaining 14 members served as federal secretaries and chairmen.

References
The information in this article is based on its Serbo-Croatian equivalent.

Government of Yugoslavia
Prime ministers